Kelvin Zakayo Mbilinyi (born 24 December 1992), better known by his pseudonym Kevoo Hard, is a Tanzanian musician.

Career
Mbilinyi is best known for his single Emiwado which was published in 2014. He recorded a single together with Lilian. In his single Love, he combined the languages of Nigeria. He learned the Languages of Nigeria with the help of Nigerian artist and musician Q Chillah (who also appeared in song Love).

Singles
 "Cheza Africa"
 "Love"
 "Kamchezo"
 "Tujidai"
 "Emiwado"

References

External links
Kelvin Mbilinyi's profile on Badoo

1992 births
Living people
Tanzanian musicians
Male songwriters
People from Iringa Region